The women's triple jump event at the 2007 World Championships in Athletics took place on August 29, 2007 (qualification) and August 31, 2007 (final) at the Nagai Stadium in Osaka, Japan. The athletes originally in third and fourth place (Hrysopiyi Devetzi of Greece and Anna Pyatykh of Russia) were retrospectively disqualified due to doping. Slovenia's Marija Šestak, originally fifth, was upgraded to the bronze medal as a result.

Medallists

Records

Results

Final

Qualification

Group A

Group B

References

External links
 Official results, qualification – IAAF.org
 Official results, final – IAAF.org
 Event report – IAAF.org

Triple jump
Triple jump at the World Athletics Championships
2007 in women's athletics